Millerelix peregrina (syn. Polygyra peregrina) is a species of land snail in the family Polygyridae. It is known by the common names strange many-whorled land snail and white liptooth. It is endemic to Arkansas in the United States, where it is found in Izard, Marion, Stone, Newton, and Searcy County in the Ozark Mountains. It occurs in dolomite cliff habitat.

References

Polygyridae
Endemic fauna of Arkansas
Molluscs of the United States
Gastropods described in 1932
Taxonomy articles created by Polbot
Taxobox binomials not recognized by IUCN